Gary Ivan Gordon (August 30, 1960 – October 3, 1993) was a master sergeant in the United States Army and a recipient of the Medal of Honor. At the time of his death, he was a non-commissioned officer in the United States Army's premier special operations unit, the 1st Special Forces Operational Detachment-Delta (1SFOD-D), or "Delta Force". Together with his comrade, Sergeant First Class Randy Shughart, Gordon was posthumously awarded the Medal of Honor for his actions during the Battle of Mogadishu in October 1993.

Early life and career
Gary Gordon was born August 30, 1960, in Lincoln, Maine, and graduated from Mattanawcook Academy in 1978. On December 4 of that year, at age 18, he joined the U.S. Army. Trained as a combat engineer, Gordon became a Special Forces Engineer with the 2nd Battalion of the 10th Special Forces Group. In December 1986, he volunteered and was selected to join the 1st Special Forces Operational Detachment-Delta (1SFOD-D), or Delta Force. As a Delta operator, Gordon eventually advanced to Team Sergeant.
Before deploying to Somalia, he married his wife Carmen and they had two children, Brittany and Ian.

Combat and death in Somalia
Gordon was posted to Mogadishu, Somalia, with other Delta members in the summer of 1993 as part of Task Force Ranger. On October 3, 1993, Gordon was Sniper Team Leader during the Battle of Mogadishu (1993), which began as a joint-force mission to apprehend key advisers to Somali warlord Mohamed Farrah Aidid. During the assault, Super Six One, one of the Army's Black Hawk helicopters providing insertion and air support to the assault team, was shot down and crashed in the city. A combat search and rescue team was dispatched to the first crash site to secure it and a short time later a second Black Hawk, Super Six Four, was shot down as well. Ranger forces on the ground were not able to assist the downed helicopter crew of the second crash site as they were already engaged in heavy combat with Aidid's militia while  making their way to the first crash site.

Gordon and his Delta Force sniper teammates Sergeant First Class Randy Shughart and Sergeant First Class Brad Halling, who were providing sniper cover from the air, wanted to be dropped at the second crash site in order to protect the four critically wounded crew, despite the fact that large numbers of armed, hostile Somalis were converging on the area. Mission commanders denied Gordon's request, saying that the situation was already too dangerous for the three Delta snipers to effectively protect the Black Hawk crew from the ground. Command's position was that the snipers could be of more assistance by continuing to provide air cover. Gordon, however, concluded that there was no way the Black Hawk crew could survive on their own, and repeated his request twice until he finally received permission. Halling had assumed control of a minigun after a crew chief was injured and was not inserted with Shughart and Gordon.

Once on the ground, Gordon and Shughart, armed with only their personal weapons and sidearms, fought their way to the downed Black Hawk. By this time more Somalis were arriving, intent on either capturing or killing the American servicemen. When they reached Super Six Four, Gordon and Shughart extracted the pilot, Chief Warrant Officer Michael Durant, co-pilot Ray Frank, and crew chiefs Bill Cleveland and Tommy Field from the aircraft, and established defensive positions around the crash site. Despite having inflicted heavy casualties on the Somalis, the two Delta snipers were outnumbered and outgunned. Their ammunition depleted, Gordon and Shughart were killed by Somali gunfire. It is believed that Gordon was the first to be killed. Shughart retrieved Gordon's CAR-15 and gave it to Durant to use. Shortly afterwards, Shughart was killed and Durant was taken alive. Immediately after the battle, the Somalis counted 25 of their own men dead with many more severely wounded. According to America and Iraq: Policy-making, Intervention and Regional Politics, Gordon's "half-naked body was dragged horrifically through the streets of Mogadishu".

Gordon's body was eventually recovered and is buried in Lincoln Cemetery, Penobscot County, Maine.

There was some confusion in the aftermath of the action as to the final moments of the firefight. The official citation states that Shughart had been killed first but Mark Bowden, author of Black Hawk Down: A Story of Modern War, a book about the October 1993 battle, relates an account by Sergeant Paul R. Howe, another Delta operator fighting in the battle. Howe said that he heard Shughart call for help on the radio. Furthermore, Durant believed that the weapon handed to him was not the distinctive M14 used by Shughart but a CAR-15; Howe said that Gordon would never have given his own weapon to another soldier to use while he was still able to fight. In Durant's book, In the Company of Heroes, he states that Gordon was on the left side of the Black Hawk, after both he and Shughart moved Durant to a safer location, and only heard Gordon say, "Damn, I'm hit." Durant acknowledged that he might have been wrong in his identification but was reluctant to push for the record to be changed since he was not sure.

After the terrorist attack on the United States on September 11, 2001, United States Special Forces units were inserted into Afghanistan to assist the Northern Alliance forces in overthrowing the Taliban and al-Qaeda terrorists. Following an intense mountain battle known as Operation Anaconda in March 2002, U.S. troops  complex found a GPS unit and pouch labeled "G. Gordon". Intelligence analysts believed at first this was Gordon's GPS unit that he purchased on the private market and used in Somalia. The Gordon family was notified immediately of the find before the information was released to the public. It ultimately turned out that it was not Gordon's GPS but one belonging to a helicopter pilot lost in an earlier fight during Operation Anaconda.

Honors and awards
MSG Gordon's personal decorations include:

 

The U.S. Navy officially named a roll-on/roll-off ship  in a ceremony at 10:00 a.m., Thursday, July 4, 1996, at Newport News, Virginia. Congressman John Murtha (D) of Pennsylvania, was the ceremony's principal speaker and Gordon's widow, Carmen Gordon, served as the ship's sponsor. Gordon was the second ship to undergo conversion from a commercial container vessel to a Large Medium Speed Roll On/Roll Off (LMSR) sealift ship and is operated by the U.S. Navy's Military Sealift Command, Washington, D.C.

Gordon has been honored elsewhere as well. Gordon Elementary School in Linden Oaks, Harnett County, North Carolina, which opened in January 2009, was named in his honor. The school is near Fort Bragg, where Gordon was stationed before being deployed to Somalia. In the Joint Readiness Training Center at Fort Polk, LA, the main mock city is named Shughart-Gordon.

Medal of Honor

On May 23, 1994, both Gordon and Shughart posthumously received the Medal of Honor in recognition for the actions they took and the sacrifices they made to help protect the lives of the crew of Super Six Four. They were the only soldiers participating in Operation Gothic Serpent to receive the military's highest honor, and the first Medal of Honor recipients since the Vietnam War. Their medals were presented to their widows Stephanie Shughart and Carmen Gordon by Bill Clinton in a ceremony at the White House.

Medal of Honor citation

In culture
In the 2001 film Black Hawk Down, Gordon was portrayed by Danish actor Nikolaj Coster-Waldau.

Marko Kloos’ novel, Lines of Departure (2014), centers around a space fleet containing the military freighter "Gary I Gordon" and Gordon's heroic actions in Somalia are referenced.

See also

160th Special Operations Aviation Regiment (Airborne), the "Night Stalkers"
List of post-Vietnam Medal of Honor recipients
Operation Restore Hope
U.S. Army Special Forces
U.S. Special Operations Forces
1st Special Forces Operational Detachment-Delta
Statue of Gary Gordon

References

Further reading

External links

 Archived

1960 births
1993 deaths
People from Lincoln, Maine
American military snipers
United States Army soldiers
Deaths by firearm in Somalia
United States Army Rangers
United States Army Medal of Honor recipients
American military personnel killed in action
Members of the United States Army Special Forces
Battle of Mogadishu (1993)
Battle of Mogadishu (1993) recipients of the Medal of Honor
Recipients of the Meritorious Service Medal (United States)
Recipients of the Humanitarian Service Medal